Apiognomonia errabunda is a fungal plant pathogen and causal agent of oak anthracnose. It is one of the most widespread leaf-associated fungi in the northern temperate zone and is found mostly on oak, beech, and linden trees.

References

External links 
 Index Fungorum
 USDA ARS Fungal Database

Gnomoniaceae
Fungal tree pathogens and diseases
Fungi described in 1918